The  or (稚泊航路 Chihaku kōro) was a ferry service in operation from 1923 to 1945 between Wakkanai in north Hokkaidō, Japan and Ōdomari, now Korsakov, in what was then Karafuto Prefecture, South Sakhalin. In November 1922, the Ministry of Railways extended the Sōya Main Line to Wakkanai Station (today's Minami-Wakkanai Station). The following May, at the behest of public and private enterprise in Hokkaidō and Karafuto, the Chihaku railway connection ferry service began operations. By the time the service was abandoned in the final days of the war in August 1945, it had ferried 2,840,000 passengers. In November 1970, a monument was erected near the North Breakwater Dome in Wakkanai in its honour.

References

Karafuto
Transport in Hokkaido
History of Hokkaido
Ferry transport in Japan